The Football Club Social Alliance (FCSA) is a network of professional European football clubs that team up for social change on a global level. The FCSA runs international projects in crisis- and development regions, and projects in disability football within Europe.

History
The FCSA was established by the Scort Foundation, a politically and religiously independent non-profit foundation headquartered in Basel, Switzerland. The foundation was established according to Swiss foundation law on 27 January 2010.

In 2012, the Queens Park Rangers F.C. joined the FCSA's partnership programme.

In May 2016, the FCSA launched the young coach education programme in Jordan. In September 2017, the FCSA launched its programme in Lebanon in  collaboration with the United Nations High Commissioner for Refugees (UNHCR) and the Lebanese Football Association. In March 2018, the 1. FSV Mainz 05 joined the FCSA's partnership programme.

Description
The FCSA aim to empower young people from conflict and crisis regions and work with disadvantaged children. Experts of the football clubs train these young dedicated women and men together with local aid organisations to become certified “Young Coaches”– football coaches and social role models.

Scort Foundation is responsible for all conceptual and organisational tasks, including the project management, fundraising and partnerships of the FCSA. The curriculum of the Young Coach Education programme was developed by Scort. Evaluations ensure that programme quality is maintained, and social impact is maximised.

Partners
 FC Basel 1893
 SV Werder Bremen
 Bayer 04 Leverkusen
 FK Austria Wien
 FC Schalke 04
 1. FSV Mainz 05 (since 2018)

Board of Directors 
Gigi Oeri (President)
Pierino Lardi (Vice President)
Pierre Jaccoud
Claudio Sulser

References

External links 
Official website

Basel
Foundations based in Switzerland
Sports charities
Organizations established in 2007
2007 establishments in Switzerland
Association football organizations
Charities based in Switzerland
Sports organizations established in 2007